Spring Valley Village is a city in Harris County, Texas, United States, and an enclave of Houston. The population was 4,229 at the 2020 U.S. census.

History
In 1936 state highway maps indicated a cemetery and a church. Initially the settlement consisted of one and one-half square miles.

In the mid-1950s, efforts to form a Spring Branch municipality (proposed to be called the city of Spring Branch in roughly the area known today as the Memorial Villages) failed. The city incorporated in 1955 as Spring Valley. There had been two elections for incorporation. The first result was against incorporation, and state law mandated that the next election for incorporation of the same boundary would have to be held at least one year later. Some advocates of incorporation convinced Robert R. Casey, then a Harris county judge, to modify the boundary of the proposed area by removing the Campbell Place area and therefore many voters who opposed incorporating. The following election, held on April 9, 1955, was in favor of incorporation, 183 for and 165 against.  Because of the 1955 incorporation, Houston did not incorporate Spring Valley's territory into its city limits, while Houston annexed surrounding areas that were unincorporated. In 1960 the city had 3,004 residents and two businesses. The city had 3,800 residents in 1976 and 3,392 residents in 1990.

In 2007, the name of the city was officially changed from Spring Valley to Spring Valley Village. 
Regardless of the name change, all postal addresses in Spring Valley Village are Houston-based.

Geography

Demographics

In 2019, the American Community Survey estimated the population of Spring Valley Village was 4,319.

As of the 2020 United States census, there were 4,229 people, 1,394 households, and 1,242 families residing in the city.

At the census of 2010, there were 3,715 people, 1,368 households, and 1,099 families residing in the city. The racial makeup of the city by population was 3,445 White, 218 Asian, 36 African American, 16 Native American, 1 Pacific Islander, 43 from other races, and 11 from two or more races, and 286 Hispanic or Latino of any race.

There were 1,368 households, out of which 476 had children under the age of 18 living with them, 964 were married couples living together, 100 had a female householder with no husband present, and 269 were non-families. 243 households were made up of individuals, and 126 had someone living alone who was 65 years of age or older. The average household size was 2.72 and the average family size was 3.09.

In the city, the population was spread out, with 2,671 over the age of 18 and 469 who were 65 years of age or older. The median age was 43.4 years.

Government and infrastructure
As of 2018 the mayor of Spring Valley Village is Tom Ramsey. Allen Carpenter, Tom Donaho, David Dominy, Joy McCormack and Marcus Vajdos currently serve as members of the city council.

Spring Valley Village Police Department is a 24-hour police organization that provides police services to the City of Spring Valley Village. As of 2016 the department employs 32 persons: 26 sworn Texas Peace Officers and 6 Telecommunication Officers. The City of Spring Valley Village was recognized as the safest city in Harris County 2019, (per Houston Chronicle survey). The Police Department was recognized by the Texas Police Chiefs Association as a recognized agency in early 2020.

Spring Valley Village is located in District 133 of the Texas House of Representatives. Jim Murphy represents the district. Spring Valley Village is within District 17 of the Texas Senate, which is currently represented by Joan Huffman.

Spring Valley Village is in Texas's 7th congressional district; in 2008, the publication Human Events identified ZIP code 77024 as the ZIP code that gave the eighth largest contribution to John McCain's 2008 US presidential election campaign. The SIP code, which includes Hedwig Village, gave $540,309 by October 24, 2008. As of 2019, however, the 7th congressional district is represented by a Democrat, Lizzie Pannill Fletcher.

Harris Health System (formerly Harris County Hospital District) designated Northwest Health Center for ZIP code 77055. The nearest public hospital is Ben Taub General Hospital in the Texas Medical Center.

Fire service
The Village Fire Department serves all of the Memorial villages.

Education

Primary and secondary schools

Spring Valley Village is served by the Spring Branch Independent School District.

Spring Valley Village is zoned to Bear Boulevard School in Spring Valley Village, Valley Oaks Elementary School in Spring Branch, Houston, Spring Branch Middle School in Hedwig Village, and Memorial High School in Hedwig Village.

Spring Branch School of Choice is located in Spring Valley Village.

Colleges and universities

Spring Branch ISD (and therefore Spring Valley Village) is served by the Houston Community College System.

Public libraries
The Harris County Public Library (HCPL) system operates the Spring Branch Memorial Branch at 930 Corbindale Road in the City of Hedwig Village. The  branch opened in 1975.

Media
The Houston Chronicle is the metropolitan newspaper. The Memorial Examiner is a local newspaper distributed in the community.

Notable people
 Pam Lychner, a Spring Valley Village real estate agent who promoted the Pam Lychner Sexual Offender Tracking and Identification Act of 1996 after an assault in a vacant house. After Lychner and her daughters died on TWA Flight 800, Congress passed the bill. The City of Spring Valley Village posted a statue of Lychner and her daughters at the city hall. After the statue was posted, visitors read the plaques, left roses, and touched the bronze. Lisa Gray of the Houston Press described it as "shamelessly emotional, a monument to a secular saint and her daughters."

References

External links

 City of Spring Valley Village official website
 

Cities in Harris County, Texas
Cities in Texas
Greater Houston